Keckiella cordifolia (formerly Penstemon cordifolius) is a species of flowering shrub in the plantain family known by the common name heartleaf keckiella. It is native to the coast and coastal mountains of southern California and northern Baja California, and it is a resident of chaparral and coastal woodland plant communities.

This is a spreading shrub reaching maximum heights in excess of two meters. Its shiny green leaves are oval to heart-shaped, pointed, and edged with small teeth. They are 2 to 6 centimeters long and arranged oppositely on the branches. The shrub produces glandular, hairy inflorescences of many flowers each. The flower is somewhat tubular with a wide open mouth. It is fuzzy on the external surface and any shade of pale orange to deep scarlet. It is up to 3 centimeters long and 4 wide at the mouth, which has three flat lower lobes and two joined upper lobes. Inside the mouth are long filamentous stamens and a flat, hairy, yellow sterile stamen called a staminode.

External links 
 Jepson Manual Treatment of Keckiella cordifolia
 Keckiella cordifolia — UC Photos gallery

cordifolia
Flora of California
Flora of Baja California
Natural history of the California chaparral and woodlands
Natural history of the Channel Islands of California
Natural history of the Peninsular Ranges
Natural history of the Santa Monica Mountains
Natural history of the Transverse Ranges